Juancho E. Irausquin Airport  is an airport on the Dutch Caribbean island of Saba.

Overview
The airport is closed to jet traffic, but regional airline propeller aircraft are able to land there under waivers from The Netherlands Antilles' Civil Aviation Authority. The most common aircraft to land there are the STOL (short takeoff and landing)-capable de Havilland Canada DHC-6 Twin Otter and Britten-Norman BN-2 Islander.

History

The idea of building an airport on Saba is credited to Remy de Haenen, who brought the idea to the Saba Economic Council along with a contractor named Jacques Deldevert. De Haenen had previously made several landings of a Vought-Sikorsky OS2U seaplane off Fort Bay harbor as early as 1946. After surveying the island by air, de Haenen suggested then-privately owned Flat Point as the site for the airport. The land was cleared and graded in only a couple of weeks. De Haenen made the first landing of an aircraft on the island of Saba on February 9, 1959, with nearly the entire population of the island in attendance.

After that first landing, de Haenen was prohibited from making further landings on the island and there were no flights to or from Saba for several years. In the lead up to the 1962 parliamentary elections, the lack of an airport on the island became a big issue. Sint Maarten politician Claude Wathey, who also represented Saba in the Parliament of the Netherlands Antilles, and Aruban politician Juancho Irausquin, who was at the time Minister of Finance for the Netherlands Antilles, supported the construction of an airport. The Dutch government made 600,000 guilders available to build it as part of a larger 3-year plan for the Windward Islands. Irausquin told friends that during a harrowing voyage to Saba by sloop in 1960 he promised to look for funds to build an airport on the island if his life was spared.

The company contracted to build the airport was owned by Wathey's brother Chester as well as Jacques Deldevert. On March 22, 1962, while the airport was under construction, three helicopters from the Dutch aircraft carrier  landed there, marking the second time aircraft landed on the island. Then on February 1, 1963, a twin engine PA-23 Apache piloted by George Greaux landed on the newly asphalted runway. The airport officially began service on July 24, 1963. Irausquin had died the year before and his widow cut the ribbon at the official opening ceremony on September 18.

Greaux and several other investors formed Windward Islands Airways (Winair) in 1961, which offered service to Saba. Regular air service to Saba did not begin immediately due to the need for a STOL aircraft and the small number of people who could afford a ticket. In 1965, the airport went unused for six months. For a while the island was serviced by a 6-passenger STOL-capable Dornier Do-28 aircraft. The December 1, 1963, Winair timetable lists flights between Saba and Sint Maarten. Service picked up when Windward Islands Airways began flying de Havilland Twin Otters in 1965.

In 1998, Hurricane Georges destroyed the airport's terminal building. The Dutch government funded construction of a new building and it was dedicated on December 6, 2002, to de Haenen. The propeller from de Haenen's first landing on the island is on display in the building.

Facilities
Jet aircraft are unable to land at the airport, because the runway is too short, but smaller STOL airplanes (such as the DHC-6, BN-2, and helicopters) are common sights. A small ramp and terminal are on the southwest flank of the runway. The ramp also has a designated helipad. The terminal building houses offices for Winair, immigration and security, a fire department with one fire truck, and a tower. The tower is an advisory service only and does not provide air traffic control. Aviation fuel is not available on the island of Saba.

Airlines and destinations

The only airline currently providing scheduled services to and from Irausquin Airport is locally owned Winair, which operates daily flights to Sint Maarten aboard a DHC-6 Twin Otter. On average, flights to Sint Maarten last no longer than 15 minutes.

Statistics

See also
List of shortest runways
Tabletop runway

References

External links

 
 
 Winair Local airline
 Aviation Pioneers of the Caribbean
 Photos of J. Yrausquin Airport from Airliners
 J. Yrausquin Airport details from World Airport Codes
 Landing Saba WinAir Twin Otter, Juancho E. Irausquin Airport (TNCS / SAB) landing video on YouTube
 ✈ Shortest runway in the world ! (HD 1080p) ✔ landing and takeoff video on YouTube

Airports in Saba
Buildings and structures in The Bottom
International airports in the Netherlands